Justin Diercks (born April 4, 1980) is an American professional stock car racing driver. He previously drove the No. 70 car for ML Motorsports. He made his Busch Series debut in 2006 in the Circuit City 250 at Richmond International Raceway. He made a total of seven Busch Series starts in 2006 with a best finish of 28th. He attempted four more races but failed to qualify for them. Diercks returned to the team in 2007, running an additional seven races. On June 29, 2007, Diercks and ML Motorsports mutually agreed to part ways. They had a best finish of 22nd at the beginning of the 2007 season.

Motorsports career results

NASCAR
(key) (Bold – Pole position awarded by qualifying time. Italics – Pole position earned by points standings or practice time. * – Most laps led.)

Busch Series

ARCA Re/Max Series
(key) (Bold – Pole position awarded by qualifying time. Italics – Pole position earned by points standings or practice time. * – Most laps led.)

References

External links
 

Living people
1980 births
Sportspeople from Davenport, Iowa
Racing drivers from Iowa
NASCAR drivers
ARCA Menards Series drivers
American Speed Association drivers